There and Back may refer to:
There & Back (Jeff Beck album)
There and Back (Dick Morrissey album)
There and Back (Skydiggers album) 
There and Back – Live, an album by Chilliwack
There & Back (TV series), reality TV series featuring Ashley Parker Angel
There and Back, an 1891 novel by George MacDonald also published as The Baron's Apprenticeship
"There and Back", a song by Seventh Wonder in their album Mercy Falls
There and Back, a 1916 short film directed by Larry Semon

See also
There and Back Again (disambiguation)